Codex Veronensis (R, Verona, Chapter Library) is a 6th-century manuscript of the Psalter in Greek and Latin. The codex consists of 405 leaves, measuring 10½ x 7½ inches; each page contains 26 lines. The Greek text appears at each opening on the left-hand page, and the Latin on the right. 

Both texts are written in Roman characters. A few lacunae (Ps. 1. 1—2. 7, 65. 20—68. 3, 68. 26—33, 105. 43—106. 2) have been supplied by a later hand, which has also added the ψαλμὸς ἰδιόγραφος (Ps. 151.). The Psalms are followed prima manu by eight canticles (Exod. 15. 1—21, Deut. 32. 1—44, 1 Regn. 2. 1—10, Isa. 5. 1—9, Jon. 2. 3—10, Hab. 3. 1—10, Magnificat, Dan. 3. 23 ff.). 

Printed by Bianchini in his Vindiciae canonicarum scripturarum''', T. I. (Rome, 1740), and used by Lagarde in the apparatus of his Specimen and Psalterii Gr. quinquagena prima, and in the Cambridge manual Septuagint (1891). A new collation was made in 1892 by H. A. Redpath, which has been employed in 142the second edition of The Old Testament in Greek'' (1896); but it is much to be wished that the Verona Chapter may find it possible to have this important Psalter photographed.

External links 
 Manuscripts of the Septuagint 
More information at Earlier Latin Manuscripts

6th-century manuscripts
Psalters
Septuagint manuscripts